Alfonso Vallicella (born 6 September 1956) is a former Italian male mountain runner, seven times world champion (three at individual level and four with the national team), at the World Mountain Running Championships.

Achievements

National titles
Italian Mountain Running Championships
Mountain running: 1987

References

External links
 
Alfonso Vallicella profile at Atletica Prisma Logistics Asd

1956 births
Living people
Italian male mountain runners
World Mountain Running Championships winners
20th-century Italian people